Shorea ochracea is a species of plant in the family Dipterocarpaceae. The species name is derived from Latin ( = the colour ochre) and refers to the colour of the undersurface of the leaf. S. ochracea is endemic to Borneo.

It is a light hardwood sold under the trade names of white meranti. Shorea ochracea is found in at least two national parks (Betung Kerihun and Bukit Baka Bukit Raya National Parks), but is threatened elsewhere due to conversion of land for palm oil plantations, mining and logging.

References

ochracea
Endemic flora of Borneo
Trees of Borneo